In pyrotechnics, black match is a type of crude fuse, constructed of cotton string fibers intimately coated with a dried black powder slurry.

When black match is confined in a paper tube, called quick match or piped match, the flame front propagates much more quickly, many feet per second.

Quick match is often used in model rockets in the United Kingdom to ignite multiple engines/motors; it is however largely unavailable in the USA due to ambiguous explosives laws.

See also 
 Fuse (explosives)
 Slow match
 Punk (fireworks)

Pyrotechnic initiators
Pyrotechnics